Antipater of Thessalonica (c. 10 BC - c. AD 38) was a Greek epigrammatist of the Roman period.

Biography 
Antipater lived during the latter part of the reign of Augustus, and perhaps into the reign of Caligula. He enjoyed the patronage of Lucius Calpurnius Piso (consul in 15 BC and then proconsul of Macedonia for several years), who appointed him governor of Thessalonica. 

As the author of over a hundred epigrams in the Greek Anthology, Antipater is the most copious and perhaps the most interesting of the Augustan epigrammatists. There are many allusions in his work to contemporary history: 
One poem celebrates the foundation of Nicopolis by Octavian after the battle of Actium
Another anticipates his victory over the Parthians in the expedition of 20 BC
Another is addressed to Gaius Caesar, who died in AD 4.

Antipater is also know to have proposed an alternative canon of nine female poets to the list of Nine Lyric Poets.

See also
Apollodorus (runner), Antipater's epigram
Greek Anthology

References

Bibliography

Primary Sources 

 Select Epigrams from the Greek Anthology. Translated by J. W. Mackail (London: Longmans, Green, and Co., 1890)
The Geography of Strabo, V (Loeb Classical Library). Translated by H. L. Jones (Cambridge MA: Harvard UP, 1928)
 The Greek Anthology, I, II, III, IV, V (Loeb Classical Library). Translated by W. R. Paton (London: Heinemann, 1916)
 Vitruvius: On Architecture, I, II (Loeb Classical Library). Translated by Frank Granger (London: Heinemann, 1931)

Secondary Sources

External links
 Antipater of Thessalonica: Epigrams at attalus.org; adapted from W. R. Paton (1916–18)
Strabo: The Geography at penelope.uchicago.edu; adapted from H. L. Jones (1917–32)

Epigrammatists of the Greek Anthology
Roman-era Thessalonians
Ancient Roman governors
Ancient Macedonian poets
Roman-era Macedonians
1st-century BC poets
Politarchs of Roman Thessalonica